The 2017 FIBA U20 European Championship Division B was the 13th edition of the Division B of the FIBA U20 European basketball championship. It was played in Oradea, Romania, from 14 to 23 July 2017. 21 teams participated in the competition. The host team, Romania, won the tournament.

Participating teams 

  (14th place, 2016 FIBA U20 European Championship Division A)

  (15th place, 2016 FIBA U20 European Championship Division A)

  (16th place, 2016 FIBA U20 European Championship Division A)

First round

Group A

Group B

Group C

Group D

17th–21st place classification

Group E

Group F
 82–80 
Armenia will play for 17th place; Azerbaijan will play for 19th place.

19th place match
 88–63

17th place match
 96–75

9th–16th place playoffs

Championship playoffs

Final standings

References

External links
FIBA official website

FIBA U20 European Championship Division B
2017–18 in European basketball
2017–18 in Romanian basketball
2017 in youth sport
International youth basketball competitions hosted by Romania
Sport in Oradea
July 2017 sports events in Europe